Łukasz Wroński (born 13 January 1994) is a Polish professional footballer who plays as an attacking midfielder for GKS Bełchatów.

Club career
On 10 August 2020, he returned to GKS Bełchatów on a one-year contract.

On 1 March 2022, Wroński moved to Puszcza Niepołomice on a deal until the end of June 2022, with a one-year extension option.

On 3 August 2022, he rejoined GKS Bełchatów yet again, signing a one-year deal with an extension option.

External links

References 

1994 births
Sportspeople from Bełchatów
Living people
Polish footballers
Poland youth international footballers
Association football midfielders
GKS Bełchatów players
Wigry Suwałki players
Stal Mielec players
GKS Katowice players
Puszcza Niepołomice players
Ekstraklasa players
I liga players
II liga players